Zbyněk Pulec (born February 5, 1948) is a Czechoslovak retired slalom canoeist who competed in the late 1960s and the early 1970s. He won three medals at the ICF Canoe Slalom World Championships, with a silver (C-1 team: 1969) and two bronzes (C-1: 1969, C-1 team: 1971).

Pulec also finished ninth in the C-1 event at the 1972 Summer Olympics in Munich.

References

Sports-reference.com profile

1948 births
Canoeists at the 1972 Summer Olympics
Czechoslovak male canoeists
Living people
Olympic canoeists of Czechoslovakia
Medalists at the ICF Canoe Slalom World Championships